Tianmu Mountain, Mount Tianmu, or Tianmushan is a mountain in Lin'an County  west of Hangzhou, Zhejiang, in eastern China.  It is made up of two peaks: West Tianmu and East Tianmu. Twin ponds near the top of the peaks led to the name of the mountain. China's Tianmu Mountain National Nature Reserve lies on the northwest portion of the mountain. It is a UNESCO Biosphere Reserve as part of UNESCO's Man and the Biosphere Program.

Tianmu is known for giant Japanese cedars, waterfalls, Tianmu tea, peaks surrounded by clouds, bamboo shoots, temples and nunneries, and odd-shaped rocks. More than 2,000 species of plants grow on the mountain, including (on West Tianmu) the last surviving truly wild population of Ginkgo trees. Prominent among the Japanese cedars is the "Giant Tree King", named by the Qianlong Emperor of the Qing. The mountain is also home to hundreds of species of birds and animals, including 39 endangered or protected species. These include the clouded leopard and the black muntjac.

In Chinese, the name Tianmushan can also refer to the adjacent range of mountains, including Mount Mogan.

See also
 Tenmoku

References

External links
 Tianmushan Biosphere Reserve Information
 Brief guide by China Daily
 A Tianmu Mountain guide from Sinoway Travel
 Chris Pearson's photos and description of Tianmu Mountain
 Photos and a quick checklist of birds found on the mountain

Biosphere reserves of China
Mountains of Zhejiang